Swisttal is a municipality in the Rhein-Sieg district, in North Rhine-Westphalia, Germany. Swisttal received its names from a brook named Swist, which flows in the middle of the municipality.

Geography
Swisttal is situated approximately 15 km west of Bonn. It covers an area of approx. 65 km² (of which 10 km² is forest, part of the Kottenforst, and 49 km² is used for agriculture).

Subdivisions 
The municipality consists of the following parishes:
 Heimerzheim
 Buschhoven
 Dünstekoven
 Essig
 Ludendorf
 Miel (Swisttal)
 Ollheim
 Odendorf
 Morenhoven
 Straßfeld
as well as the hamlets of Hohn, Vershoven, Moemerzheim and Muettinghoven. The local administration is situated between the villages Ludendorf and Essig.

Buildings and places
In the vicinity of the Buschhoven is the route of the former Eifel water pipeline (Eifel Aqueduct), a Roman aqueduct built to supply Cologne with drinking water. The water castle in Morenhoven, the castle of Heimerzheim and the reconciliation church in Buschhoven with its reconditioned romance organ, are worth mentioning.

Parks
Kottenforst-Ville Nature Park, a natural preserve.

Notable residents
 Helmuth Prieß

References

External links